This is a list of spaceflights launched between July and December 1963. For launches between January and June, see 1963 in spaceflight (January–June). For an overview of the whole year, see 1963 in spaceflight.

Launches

|colspan=8 style="background:white;"|

July
|-

|colspan=8 style="background:white;"|

August
|-

|colspan=8 style="background:white;"|

September
|-

|colspan=8 style="background:white;"|

October
|-

|colspan=8 style="background:white;"|

November
|-

|colspan=8 style="background:white;"|

December
|-

|}

References

Footnotes

(July-December), 1963 In Spaceflight
Spaceflight by year